The 2021 NWHL Draft took place on June 29, 2021. With the first pick in the draft, the Connecticut Whale selected Taylor Girard from the Quinnipiac Bobcats.

Player selections
A total of 30 players were drafted, of which 20 were American, seven were Canadian, and one is British, another is Czech, and one is Russian. The following is the breakdown of the 30 players selected by position:

 15 Forwards
 14 Defenders
 1 Goaltender

Selections

Trades involving draft picks
The following trades were made and resulted in exchanges of draft picks between the teams.

To complete the trade from April 28, 2020: Boston Pride to Toronto Six - The Pride obtained the first overall pick of the 2020 NWHL Draft. In exchange, Toronto received Boston's 2020 first round pick (6th overall), plus their first and second round picks in this draft.  It was also the first trade in Toronto Six franchise history.

International Draft
A draft of international players was held on July 25, 2021.

References 

Premier Hockey Federation